Randy Collins is a Canadian politician and a former New Democratic Party (NDP) member of the Newfoundland and Labrador House of Assembly. He represented the Labrador West riding until his resignation in early 2007 due to corruption charges.

Background

Randy Collins was born in Gambo, Newfoundland and Labrador and graduated from Smallwood Academy.  He moved to Labrador City in 1972. He was employed by the Iron Ore Company of Canada for 25 years and has an interprovincial millwright certificate.  He was elected to the executive of the United Steelworkers of America (USWA) Local 5795 from 1978 to 1991, and was president from 1985 to 1991. In 1991, Collins was elected as staff representative to the USWA.

He was first elected to the legislature in the 1999 election, and was re-elected in 2003.  He had previously been the federal NDP candidate in Labrador in the 1997 federal election, where he finished a relatively close second.

Controversy

In September 2009, he pleaded guilty to charges of fraud over $5,000 and fraud on the government.
At his sentencing hearing in December 2009, he said "What I did was wrong." He was sentenced to 21 months in prison.

References

Living people
Newfoundland and Labrador New Democratic Party MHAs
United Steelworkers people
Year of birth missing (living people)
People from Labrador City
People from Gambo, Newfoundland and Labrador
Canadian politicians convicted of fraud
21st-century Canadian politicians